Gustavo Daniel de Simone Horn (born April 23, 1948) is a Uruguayan football coach and former national team player.

Club career
As a player, he had a short stint in Argentina with Chacarita Juniors where he played 24 league games.

International career
Desimone represented his country in 3 FIFA World Cup qualification matches.

References

External links
 

 

1948 births
Living people
Footballers from Montevideo
Uruguayan footballers
Uruguay international footballers
1974 FIFA World Cup players
Defensor Sporting players
Chacarita Juniors footballers
Argentine Primera División players
Uruguayan expatriate footballers
Expatriate footballers in Argentina
Uruguayan expatriate sportspeople in Argentina
Uruguayan expatriate sportspeople in Costa Rica
Uruguayan expatriate sportspeople in El Salvador
Uruguayan expatriate sportspeople in Spain
Uruguayan expatriate sportspeople in Guatemala
Uruguayan football managers
C.S. Herediano managers
Costa Rica national football team managers
Xerez CD managers
Panama national football team managers
C.D. Luis Ángel Firpo managers
L.D.U. Quito managers
Expatriate football managers in Costa Rica
Expatriate football managers in Spain
Expatriate football managers in Colombia
Expatriate football managers in El Salvador
Expatriate football managers in Guatemala
Association football defenders
Cúcuta Deportivo managers